David Agung Susanto (born 21 July 1991) is an Indonesian tennis player.

Susanto has a career high ATP singles ranking of 732 achieved on 3 April 2017 and a career high ATP doubles ranking of 642, achieved on 17 July 2017. Susanto has won 4 ITF Futures doubles titles.

Susanto has represented Indonesia at the Davis Cup, where he has a win–loss record of 9–15.

Titles and Finals

ITF Futures Singles Finals (0-1)

ITF Futures Doubles Finals (5-6)

External links

1991 births
Living people
Indonesian male tennis players
Sportspeople from Jakarta
Southeast Asian Games gold medalists for Indonesia
Southeast Asian Games silver medalists for Indonesia
Southeast Asian Games medalists in tennis
Tennis players at the 2014 Asian Games
Tennis players at the 2018 Asian Games
Competitors at the 2011 Southeast Asian Games
Asian Games competitors for Indonesia
Competitors at the 2015 Southeast Asian Games
Competitors at the 2019 Southeast Asian Games
Southeast Asian Games bronze medalists for Indonesia